These are 15 National Natural Landmarks in Maine. 

Maine
National Natural Landmarks